İnkaya can refer to:

 İnkaya
 İnkaya Cave
 İnkaya, Karacabey
 İnkaya, Kulp